The Treaty of Königsberg was signed in Königsberg (Królewiec) on 30 January 1384, during the Lithuanian Civil War (1381–1384) between Vytautas the Great and representatives of the Teutonic Knights. Vytautas waged a civil against his cousin Jogaila, Grand Duke of Lithuania and future King of Poland, and allied himself with the Teutonic Knights. In order to secure Teutonic support in the civil war, Vytautas signed the treaty and granted Samogitia up to the Nevėžis River and Kaunas to the Knights. In 1382 Jogaila promised the Knights Samogitia only up to the Dubysa River, but never ratified the Treaty of Dubysa. Samogitia was important for the Knights as this territory physically separated them from uniting with the Livonian order in the north. Vytautas also promised to become Order's vassal. In February several Samogitian regions acknowledged their support to Vytautas and the Knights.

On 16 July 1384 Vytautas re-confirmed the Treaty of Königsberg in New Marienverder, a new fortress built on the Neman River. However, the treaty was broken in July when Vytautas and Jogaila reconciled. Vytautas burned Teutonic castles and returned to Lithuania. During the Lithuanian Civil War (1389–1392) Vytautas once again asked for military support from the Knights. On 19 January 1390 he signed the Treaty of Lyck, confirming the Treaty of Königsberg only to break it again in 1392. Vytautas granted Samogitia to the Knights two more times: by Treaty of Salynas (1398) and by Treaty of Raciąż (1404). 

Lithuanian historian Danilevičius and Polish historian Koneczny raised doubts whether the treaty is original and not a Teutonic forgery.

References

1384 in Europe
Treaties of the Teutonic Order
Königsberg
1380s treaties
Treaties of the Grand Duchy of Lithuania
14th century in the State of the Teutonic Order
History of Samogitia
14th century in Lithuania